Growth arrest-specific protein 2 is a protein that in humans is encoded by the GAS2 gene.

The protein encoded by this gene is a caspase-3 substrate that plays a role in regulating microfilament and cell shape changes during apoptosis. It can also modulate cell susceptibility to p53-dependent apoptosis by inhibiting calpain activity. Two alternatively spliced transcript variants encoding the same protein have been described for this gene.

References

Further reading